Vinylferrocene is the organometallic compound with the formula (C5H5)Fe(C5H4CH=CH2).  It is a derivative of ferrocene, with a vinyl group attached to one cyclopentadienyl ligand. As the ferrocene analogue of styrene, it is the precursor to some polyferrocenes.  It is an orange, air-stable oily solid that is soluble in nonpolar organic solvents.

Vinylferrocene can be prepared by the dehydration of α-hydroxylethylferrocene, which is obtained from acetylferrocene.

References

Ferrocenes
Cyclopentadienyl complexes
Vinyl compounds